Erzsebet Jurik is a female Hungarian former international table tennis player.

Table tennis career
She won three bronze medals at the World Table Tennis Championships; two in the Corbillon Cup (women's team event) and one in the women's doubles with Éva Kóczián.

See also
 List of table tennis players
 List of World Table Tennis Championships medalists

References

Hungarian female table tennis players
World Table Tennis Championships medalists
Living people
Year of birth missing (living people)